Fay White may refer to:

 Faye White (born 1978), English footballer
 Fay White (singer), Australian singer and songwriter